Irditoxin is a three-finger toxin (3FTx) protein found in the venom of the brown tree snake (Boiga irregularis) and likely in other members of the genus Boiga. It is a heterodimer composed of two distinct protein chains, each of the three-finger protein fold, linked by an intermolecular disulfide bond. This structure is unusual for 3FTx proteins, which are most commonly monomeric.

Structure 
Three-finger toxin (3FTx) proteins canonically consist of approximately 60-80 amino acid residues that assume a structure with three "finger"-like beta strand-containing loops projecting from a core stabilized by four intramolecular disulfide bonds. Irditoxin is a covalent heterodimer in which two subunits are linked by an intermolecular disulfide bond. Each subunit is of the three-finger toxin (3FTx) protein superfamily and is most closely related to the "non-conventional" 3FTx subclass, characterized by the presence of an additional disulfide bond in the first of the canonical three "finger" loops. Each subunit thus contains 11 cysteine residues: the eight canonical residues that form the core disulfide bonds, the two in the first loop forming the non-conventional disulfide, and the one that forms the dimeric linkage. Irditoxin subunits A and B are 75 and 77 amino acid residues long, respectively, and each possess a seven-residue extension with a pyroglutamic acid post-translational modification at the N-terminus.

Irditoxin's structure is highly unusual within the 3FTx superfamily. Most 3FTx proteins are monomers. The best-studied exception is kappa-bungarotoxin, a non-covalent homodimer with a very different protein-protein interaction surface; the recently described alpha-cobratoxin also forms both covalent homodimers and low-abundance covalent heterodimers with other 3FTx proteins found in monocled cobra (Naja kaouthia) venom. It is as yet unclear how irditoxin's two subunits contribute to its biological activities.

Function 
Irditoxin is an abundant protein in the venom of the brown tree snake and accounts for about 10% of the protein found in venom samples of brown treesnakes collected from Guam, where they are an invasive species. Irditoxin's toxic effects are highly species-dependent; in laboratory tests, it is highly toxic to lizards and birds but not to mammals. Although the molecular mechanism of toxicity is not clear, irditoxin produces robust post-synaptic blockade of signaling in the avian neuromuscular junction.

Discovery and nomenclature
Irditoxin was first described in 2009 after isolation from samples of venom from the brown tree snake. Its name is a contraction of "B. irregularis dimeric toxin". Other Boiga species, and possibly other colubrid snakes, likely possess homologous proteins.

References 

Neurotoxins